A constitutional referendum was held in South Korea on 22 October 1980. The changes to the constitution were approved by 91.6% of voters, with a turnout of 95.5%.

Results

References 

1980 referendums
1980 elections in South Korea
Constitutional referendums in South Korea